{{Infobox writer
| name = Sudhakar Mangalodayam
| image = 
| imagesize = 
| caption = 
| pseudonym = 
| birth_date = 14 January 1956
| birth_place = Velloor, Vaikom, Kottayam, Kerala, India
| death_date = 17 July 2020
| death_place = Velloor, Vaikom, Kottayam, Kerala, India
| occupation = Writer, screenwriter
| nationality = Indian
| period = 
| genre = Fiction, cinema
| subject = 
| spouse = Usha (m.  1988)
| children = Sreevidya
| parents = 
| movement = 
| notableworks = {{ubl|Murappennu|Nandini Oppol|Koodappirappu|Maunasarovaram|Namam Japikkunna Veedu|Padasaram|Safalam|Chitta|Thillana|Amma|Kungumappottu}}
        
Chuttuvilakku 
| influences = 
| influenced = 
| awards = 
| signature = 
| website = 
}}

Sudhakar P. Nair,  (14 January 1956 – 17 July 2020) popularly known as Sudhakar Mangalodayam, was an Indian writer of Malayalam literature and a story and screenwriter in Malayalam cinema. He was known for his popular novels as well as for the screenplay of Njan Ekananu, a 1982 Malayalam language film. He was the author of over 50 novels and wrote the story for films viz. Kariyilakkattu Pole, Nandini Oppol and Vasantha Sena.

 Biography 
Sudhakar Mangalodayam was born Sudhakar P. Nair in Velloor, in Vaikom, in Kottayam district of the south Indian state of Kerala to Parameswaran Nair and Janakiamma. After schooling at St. Ignatius School, Kanjiramattom, he did his college education at NSS College, Ottapalam from where he obtained his graduate degree. He started writing during this period, starting with radio plays. Later, he served as an assistant to noted film director, P. Chandrakumar. Soon, he started writing novels and published them as serials in periodicals, sometimes writing up to 9 novels simultaneously.

Sudhakar Mangalodayam, who followed the literary style popularized by such writers as MT Vasudevan Nair, wrote over 50 novels which include Murappennu, Nandini Oppol, Koodappirappu, Maunasarovaram, Namam Japikkunna Veedu, Padasaram, Safalam, Chitta, Thillana, Amma and Kungumappottu. His foray into films was with Njan Ekananu, a 1982 film directed by P. Chandrakumar, for which he wrote the story, screenplay and dialogues. Subsequently, he wrote the story for three more films, viz. Vasantha Sena (1985), Kariyilakkattu Pole (1986) and Nandini Oppol'' (1994).

Sudhakar was married to G. Usha and the couple had a daughter, Sreevidya. He died on 17 July 2020, at the age of 64, succumbing to age-related illnesses; his wife had predeceased him.

Selected bibliography

Filmography

See also 
 Muttathu Varkey
 Kanam E. J.

References

Further reading

External links 
 
 
 
 

Malayalam novelists
People from Kerala
Indian male novelists
Malayalam-language writers
Writers from Kottayam
20th-century Indian novelists
21st-century Indian novelists
Novelists from Kerala
Malayalam screenwriters
People from Kottayam district
2020 deaths
1956 births